Sir Francis Molyneux Ommanney, (4 October 1774 – 7 November 1840)  was an English politician who represented Barnstaple from 1818 to 1824.

The second son of Rear Admiral Cornthwaite Ommanney, and brother of Admiral Sir John Acworth Ommanney he married Georgiana Frances  Hawkes in 1801: they had 9 children, including: 
Rev. Edward Aislabie Ommanney (1806–1884)
Sir Erasmus Ommanney (1814–1904) himself became an Admiral.
Colonel Octavius Ommanney (1816–1901)
Manaton Collingwood Ommanney (1816–1857)
Rev. George Druce Wynne Ommanney (1819–1902)
John Orde Ommanney (d. 1846), who married in 1839 Susanna McTaggart (ca. 1812 – 1902), daughter of Sir John McTaggart, 1st Baronet, and left an only daughter Marianne Susanna Ommanney who married in 1866 Sir Mark Stewart, 1st Baronet.
Francis Ommanney, who married Julia Henrietta, daughter of Thomas Metcalfe, of Fitzroy Square, and was father of Montagu Ommanney, head of the Colonial Office from 1900 to 1907.
Frances Georgiana Ommanney, who married Lieut.-Colonel Edward Ommanney Hollist

A grandson, became a Rear Admiral.

References

1774 births
1840 deaths
UK MPs 1818–1820
UK MPs 1820–1826
Members of the Parliament of the United Kingdom for Barnstaple
Politicians awarded knighthoods